Events from the year 1615 in France

Incumbents
 Monarch – Louis XIII

Events
 24 November – Louis XIII marries Anne of Austria
 Unknown
 The Company of the Moluccas is established to trade in the East Indies
 Construction work commences on the Luxembourg Palace designed by Salomon de Brosse
 The Merian map of Paris is created
 Production of carpets at the Savonnerie manufactory is begun by Pierre DuPont

Births
 27 January – Nicolas Fouquet, Superintendent of Finances (died 1680)

Deaths
 27 March – Margaret of Valois, dowager queen of France (born 1553)

References

1610s in France